{{Speciesbox
| name = Twisted sun orchid
| image = Thelymitra flexuosa.jpg
| image_caption = Thelymitra flexuosa near Pearcedale
| genus = Thelymitra
| species = flexuosa
| authority = Endl.
| synonyms_ref = 
| synonyms = * Macdonaldia flexuosa (Endl.) Szlach.
 Macdonaldia concolor Lindl.
 Macdonaldia smithiana Gunn ex Lindl.
 Thelymitra smithiana (Gunn ex Lindl.) Hook.f.
}}Thelymitra flexuosa, known as the twisted sun orchid, is a species of orchid that is endemic to southern Australia. It has a single thin, wiry leaf and up to four cream-coloured to canary yellow flowers with four rows of short hairs on the back of the column. It is a common and widespread species, superficially similar to T. antennifera.

The labellum (the lowest petal) is shorter and narrower than the other petals and sepals. The lobe on the top of the anther is short with a few brown glands on its back. The side lobes are bright yellow and covered with short hairs. The flowers are short-lived, self-pollinating and open only slowly on hot, humid days. Flowering occurs from September to November.

Taxonomy and namingThelymitra flexuosa was first formally described in 1839 by Stephan Endlicher and the description was published in Novarum Stirpium Decades. The specific epithet (flexuosa'') is a Latin word meaning "full of bends", "tortuous", "crooked" or "winding", referring to the twisted or "zig-zagged" flowering stem.

Distribution and habitat
The twisted sun orchid is widespread and common throughout its range. It grows with sedges and low shrubs in moist places such as the edge of swamps. It occurs in southern Victoria, south-eastern South Australia, Western Australia and Tasmania. In Western Australia it is found between Kalbarri and Israelite Bay.

References

External links
 
 

flexuosa
Endemic orchids of Australia
Orchids of South Australia
Orchids of Victoria (Australia)
Orchids of Tasmania
Orchids of Western Australia
Plants described in 1840